Holarchaea is a genus of South Pacific araneomorph spiders in the family Anapidae, and was first described by Raymond Robert Forster in 1955.  it contains only two species, H. globosa and H. novaeseelandiae, but there may still be undescribed species in New Zealand.

They are one of few spider taxa that do not have venom glands.

They are known only from the forests of Tasmania and New Zealand, where they live in many microhabitats that regularly have high humidity. Originally placed with the assassin spiders, it was moved to its own family, Holarchaeidae, in 1984, and Holarchaeidae was synonymized with Anapidae in 2017.

References

Anapidae
Araneomorphae genera
Fauna of Tasmania
Spiders of Australia
Spiders of New Zealand
Taxa named by Raymond Robert Forster